Shehong is a county-level city in the east of Sichuan province, China, located in the central part of the Sichuan Basin. It is under the administration of the prefecture-level city of Suining.

The Fu River flows through the city seat as well as the towns of Jinhua and Liushu, along which hydropower stations provide electricity for the county and neighboring areas.

Climate

Education
Shehong has one national model secondary school, Shehong Secondary School. And three other provincial model secondary schools, Liushu Secondary School, Taihe Secondary School and Jinhua Secondary School.

References

External links 
 Official website of the Shehong County Government

County-level cities in Sichuan
Suining